The Long Utopia is a science fiction novel by  Terry Pratchett and Stephen Baxter published on 23 June 2015.

It is the fourth in the five-book series of the sequence The Long Earth.

Plot
The Long Utopia further follows the adventures of Joshua Valienté and Lobsang,  as well as delving into Joshua's ancestry. After faking his death, Lobsang and his wife settle on an unexplored Earth, the rotation of which is being artificially accelerated without their knowledge.

References

2015 British novels
Doubleday (publisher) books
Utopia
2015 science fiction novels
Collaborative novels